Ian Campbell, 12th Duke of Argyll,  (28 August 1937 – 21 April 2001), styled Marquess of Lorne between 1949 and 1973, was a Scottish peer and Chief of Clan Campbell. He was the 12th Duke of Argyll in the Peerage of the United Kingdom and Lord Lieutenant of Argyll and Bute.

In 1953, he was made a Fellow of the Royal Society for the Encouragement of Arts, Manufactures and Commerce. He served with the Argyll and Sutherland Highlanders, earning the rank of captain. Following his military service he worked in banking, then spent four years as a sales executive with Rank Xerox Export, regularly travelling behind the Iron Curtain. In 1968 he took over running the dukedom's Inveraray Castle estate for his father.

Family history
The Campbell family descends from Gillespic Cambel, who some nine centuries ago acquired lands in the barony of Lochow, Co Argyll, by marriage to his cousin Aife, daughter and heir of Paul an Sporran, Royal Treasurer and last of the Clan O'Duin, descended of Diarmid. From the 13th century the Lochow Campbells held the title of Mac Cailein Mhor, Chief of Clan Campbell.

In 1291, Sir Colin Campbell, of Lochow, was one of the nominees, on the part of Robert the Bruce, in the contest for the Crown of Scotland. Sir Duncan Campbell, of Lochow, became a Lord of Parliament as Lord Campbell under James II in 1445. His son Colin, the 2nd Lord Campbell, was created Earl of Argyll in 1457. The 10th Earl was advanced to the rank of Duke in the peerage of Scotland in 1701.  

Argyll was the son of Ian Campbell, 11th Duke of Argyll, and his second wife, Louise Hollingsworth Morris Clews. On the death of his father in 1973, Argyll became a member of the board of directors of three distilleries and in 1977 became Chairman of Beinn Bhuidhe Holdings Ltd. in 1977. He was invested as a Knight of the Order of St. John in 1975. Married in 1964 to Iona Mary Colquhoun, daughter of Sir Ivar Colquhoun, 8th Baronet, the couple had a son Torquhil Ian Campbell, 13th Duke of Argyll and a daughter Lady Louise Iona Campbell, now Lady Louise Burrell. They lived at Inveraray Castle in Argyll. While most Dukes and Duchesses of Argyll are buried at Kilmun Parish Church, the 12th Duke and his father, the 11th Duke, both chose to be buried on the island of Inishail in Loch Awe. Iona, Duchess of Argyll, and her daughter Lady Louise are both Patronesses of the Royal Caledonian Ball.

Armorial bearings

Education
He was brought up in Portugal and France, educated at Institut Le Rosey in Switzerland and Glenalmond College in Scotland before going on to McGill University in Canada where he studied engineering.

Ancestry

References

External links

Ian Campbell, 12th Duke of Argyll
pedigree

1937 births
2001 deaths
Argyll and Sutherland Highlanders officers
Ian Campbell, 12th Duke of Argyll
Deputy Lieutenants of Argyll and Bute
12
Knights of the Order of Saint John (chartered 1888)
Lord-Lieutenants of Argyll and Bute
McGill University Faculty of Engineering alumni
People educated at Glenalmond College
Scottish people of American descent
Alumni of Institut Le Rosey
20th-century Scottish landowners
20th-century Scottish businesspeople
Argyll